A Philanthropreneur, also known as a Philanthro-capitalist, is a Portmanteau of entrepreneur and Philanthropy. Internet entrepreneur Mark Desvauz claimed to coin this term in 2004. However, The Wall Street Journal used the term in a 1999 article, while a publication entitled The Philanthropreneur Newsletter existed as far back as 1997. Philanthropreneurship is often considered the start of a new era in Philanthropy, characterized by the development of the Philanthropist's role and the integration of business practices.

The core objective of Philanthropreneurship is to increase the Philanthropic impact of non-profit organizations through the use of corporations. Traditionally, non-profit organizations solely depended on donations, grants, or other forms of charitable giving. However, Philanthropreneurship differs by investing rather than donating; there is an expectation of financial profit on top of the social profit traditionally associated with non-profit organizations. Philanthropreneurs aim to achieve social change that is supposed to be both profitable and sustainable.

Description
Philanthropreneurs are interested in effecting positive change in the world and doing so whilst making a profit. Philanthropreneurs are often "driven to do good and have their profit, too", as Stephanie Strom wrote 13 November 2016 in a New York Times article.

Theoretical Framework of Philanthropreneurship 
As an emerging field, there is no defined operating model or strategic approach. Still, philanthropreneurship marks the transition from a grant and donation model to a profit model with predefined objectives and constant focus on quantifiable results. This form of “commercial giving” demands measurable return, which is why opportunities are assessed and evaluated according to different criteria. Factors such as profitability and quantifiable performance are fixed requirements for granting support. The shift towards more business-minded professional management has also resulted in a greater focus on long-term goals.

The application of entrepreneurial practices in philanthropy drives the impact of connected non-profit organizations through strategic funding. Traditional philanthropy encouraged the promotion of social welfare exclusively through charitable giving. Philanthropreneurship differs from the traditional non-profit organization set up by prioritizing revenue-generating strategies over donations and social impact. In philanthropreneurship, prosperous ventures require the establishment of recurring income as a means of avoiding depletion of funds and ultimately preventing the organization's dissolution.

Philanthropic buying has a limited reach, which is why philanthropreneurs do not dispose of surplus funds, but tailor investments by actively leveraging their class advantages like wealth, time, business expertise, networks, and reputation. Philanthropreneurship is measured in impact, sustainability and scalability.

Philanthropreneurs include Bill and Melinda Gates, Steve Case, Pierre Omidyar and Bill Clinton. Philanthropreneurship is now supported by emerging new business models and legislation including low-profit limited liability companies (L3Cs), created by a tax attorney experienced in entrepreneurial finance named Marc J. Lane.

Controversies
Non-profit organizations have historically found it challenging to trust and accept the concept of "philanthro-capitalism". Critics note that many metrics of the commercial sectors, such as return on investment lack applicability to non-profit organizations.  Moreover, the inclusion of commercial and enterprise strategies has generated concerns in maintaining the institution's culture and ideology. A particular concern is the risk that the organization's focus will shift away from the social mission and instead towards satisfying the need for profit.

The performance assessment of philanthropreneurial ventures remains an area of concern for many, as there is no precise measurement for social impact. For example, in "impact investing", a core practice of philanthropreneurship, project selection for funding is based on estimated social impact and financial return. From an ethical context, many critics argue that the incorporation of a business model commercializes the nonprofit sector and further increases the risk of distorting the organization's mission and principles, alienating the very people it would help.

Conversely, many supporters point out that traditional philanthropy alone cannot sustain social initiatives because of the shortage in sources of funding. In philanthropreneurship, a dependency on traditional fundraising has been a strong predictor of failure, which is why the need to diversify income sources was introduced through the concept of philanthrocapitalism.

Practitioners of philanthropreneurship

Amr Al-Dabbagh
Steve Case
Bill Clinton
Bill and Melinda Gates Foundation
Pierre Omidyar

See also
 Social entrepreneurship
 Mutual Aid
 Capitalism
 Social Work
 Impact Investing

References

External links
  Fortune article examining entrepreneurial practices for non-profits
 Guardian article on philanthropreneurship
 New York Times article examining philanthropreneurs
 Book on business solutions to the world's top social problems
 "Philanthropreneuring for the Rest of Us"

Philanthropy
Social ethics
Social philosophy
Business models